China Shavers (born June 16, 1977) is an American actress best known for her supporting roles as Brooke Harper on the high school drama Boston Public and as Dreama on the supernatural sitcom Sabrina, the Teenage Witch.

Career
Shavers had a recurring role on the TV series ER. Her guest-star appearances include roles in Beverly Hills, 90210, The District, Girlfriends and Sleeper Cell, among others. She appeared in films like National Lampoon's Adam & Eve, The Glass House, Not Another Teen Movie and Dorm Daze 2.

Filmography

References

External links

1977 births
20th-century American actresses
21st-century American actresses
American film actresses
African-American actresses
American television actresses
Living people
Place of birth missing (living people)
20th-century African-American women
20th-century African-American people
21st-century African-American women
21st-century African-American people